Phiala odites is a moth in the family Eupterotidae. It was described by Schaus in 1893. It is found in Sierra Leone.

The wingspan is 48 mm. The wings are snowy white, the outer portion of the veins on the forewings finely outlined with brown. The veins of the hindwings are yellowish.

References

Moths described in 1893
Eupterotinae